Amenia imperialis is a blowfly in the family Calliphoridae.

Larvae 
Studies suggest that Amenia imperialis is macrolarviparous, giving birth to well developed and large larvae.

Distribution
Amenia imperialis is found in Australia.

It has been reported that "... that two other "forms" of A. imperialis can be distinguished: one occurring in northwestern Australia and arid areas of New South Wales and Queensland, the other in the vicinity of Cooktown, Queensland."

Gallery

References

Insects described in 1830
Calliphoridae